Armands Ābols is a Latvian pianist.

In 1992 Abols won at 18 Barcelona's Maria Canals International Music Competition. Three years later he took part at the XIII Paloma O'Shea Competition, the dean of Spanish piano competitions; he made it to the finals, ranking along the rest of the finalists second to Enrico Pompili - the Grand Prize was declared void, a decision Ābols criticised.

In 1993 he began a concert career, regularly performing through South America. In the mid-90s he settled in Chile. Since 2003 he holds a professorship at the conservatory of the Austral University of Chile.

References

 Semanas Musicales de Frutillar
 Southern University of Chile's Conservatory

1973 births
Latvian classical pianists
Academic staff of the Austral University of Chile
Maria Canals International Music Competition prize-winners
Living people
Latvian emigrants to Chile
21st-century classical pianists
Musicians from Valdivia